Angela Steinbach (born 31 March 1955 in Kleve) is a German former swimmer who competed in the 1972 Summer Olympics.

References

1955 births
Living people
German female swimmers
German female freestyle swimmers
Olympic swimmers of West Germany
Swimmers at the 1972 Summer Olympics
Olympic bronze medalists for West Germany
Olympic bronze medalists in swimming
People from Kleve
Sportspeople from Düsseldorf (region)
World Aquatics Championships medalists in swimming
Medalists at the 1972 Summer Olympics